is the sixth Japanese single released by Korean boy group The Boss. It was scheduled to be released on August 1, 2012 on their Japanese label Sony Music Entertainment. The single's B-side song "Ikenai 1・2・3" was already revealed to be featured in the upcoming movie Ai Ore!, which features member Karam.

Single information
The title track, "Honki Magic", was produced by Japanese group Orange Range's Naoto, and penned by his bandmate Hiroki.

The single is set to include its title track "Honki Magic", as well as b-sides "Ikenai 1・2・3" and "Pretty Smile". Along with these three new songs comes an instrumental of the single's title track. It will released in three different versions, including a regular edition, limited edition A and limited edition B. Limited edition A includes a CD, a DVD and a booklet. Limited edition B includes a CD and a DVD. First press regular edition comes with a trading card randomly selected from six kinds and an event ticket (valid only in Japan).

Track list

CD

Limited edition A DVD

Limited edition B DVD

Charts

Release history

References

External links
 大国男児 | Sony Music 
 The Boss official website 

2012 singles
J-pop songs
2012 songs
Sony Music Entertainment Japan singles